USS Cocopa (ATF-101) was an  fleet ocean tug that served on active duty with the U.S. Navy from 1944 to 1978, seeing action in World War II, the Korean War and the Vietnam War.  After thirty-four years of service, she was sold to the Mexican Navy, where she was still in service as of 2009.

World War II
Cocopa was named after an Arizona Indian tribe.  She began her naval career with the Atlantic fleet during the waning months of World War II, making two passages across the Atlantic with barges in tow, followed by a third passage to Trinidad.  Her second convoy was attacked by a German U-boat, with Cocopa barely escaping destruction.  Cocopa was next ordered to the Pacific theater, witnessing the final days of the war between July and August of that year. V-J day found the ship in Leyte, Philippines.

Interwar service
Following World War II, Cocopa shuttled between the Philippines, Shanghai, Okinawa and Hong Kong on occupation duty, before returning to Puget Sound Naval Shipyard in January 1947 for an overhaul. From 1948–49 she plied Alaskan waters.

In June 1951, having returned to the Far East, Cocopa accepted what many writers have termed the last Japanese surrender from World War II. Lieutenant Commander James B. Johnson accepted the capitulation of nineteen Japanese soldiers who had been living on the island of Anatahan, in the Northern Mariana Islands. The ship repatriated these men and their personal effects to Guam, from whence they were ultimately returned to Japan. However, other Japanese holdouts continued to surrender over the next few decades, though in much smaller numbers.

Korean War
Cocopa saw action in the Korean War during the summer of 1953. During this period she served off both Korean coasts; in one operation, she towed , a Royal Canadian Navy destroyer that had run aground on the island of Pang Yang-Do, just off the North Korean coast well north of enemy-held Wonsan harbor. At the time of the armistice, she went to Wonsan to aid in the removal of a Marine garrison occupying a small islet at the harbor's mouth. During the Korean War, USS Cocopa received one battle star for her service.

After the war, Cocopa conducted numerous Pacific Ocean and Alaskan cruises.  Her home port was changed from Pearl Harbor to San Diego in 1961.

Operation Castle
In March 1954, Cocopa was one of the ships tasked to support Operation Castle, a series of high-energy (high-yield) nuclear tests by Joint Task Force SEVEN (JTF-7) at Bikini Atoll. Official reports indicated that crewmembers suffered the highest doses (2.2 rem) of radiation endured by any of the navy ships present at this operation.

Vietnam War

During the Vietnam War, Cocopa saw service in five campaigns: Advisory (1963), Vietnam Defense (1965), Counteroffensive Phase II (1967), Summer-Fall 1969, and Ceasefire (1972).  In 1965, Cocopa hosted Detachment Charlie of Beach Jumpers Unit One, Team Twelve, operating as the "Yankee Station Special Surveillance Unit". This outfit consisted of one officer and five enlisted men, whose mission was to jam Soviet electronic intelligence trawlers monitoring U.S. operations in the Gulf of Tonkin. Team members utilized random wave jamming with noises (including bagpipe recordings) to counteract Russian SIGINT activities.  Cocopa also assisted in towing, recovery and similar operations throughout her tours in Vietnam.

Awards
American Campaign Medal
European-African-Middle Eastern Campaign Medal
Asiatic-Pacific Campaign Medal)
World War II Victory Medal
Navy Occupation Service Medal
National Defense Service Medal with star
Korean Service Medal with one battle star
Armed Forces Expeditionary Medal
Vietnam Service Medal with five campaign stars 
United Nations Korea Medal
Republic of Korea War Service Medal
Republic of Vietnam Campaign Medal

Mexican Navy service
On 30 September 1978, Cocopa was decommissioned and sold to Mexico under the Security Assistance Program, where she was recommissioned in the Mexican Navy as ARM Seri (RE-03). As of 2009 the ship remains on active duty with that force.

References

Bibliography
 Task Force 77. Contains brief, detailed info on Cocopa's Korean War service.
 Official Damage Report of the Grounding of HMCS Huron.  Describes role of the Cocopa (referred to in this report as "the tug") in towing the damaged Huron.

External links
 USS Cocopa. Offers several photos from the Cocopa's service, circa 1952-78.
 Last Defenders of the Japanese Empire. Photo of 19 Japanese soldiers on Anatahan surrendering to Lt. Cmdr. J.B. Johnson, captain of the Cocopa.
 My Journey to Vietnam, by Steven Karoly. Personal account by a Cocopa cook of a stormy voyage to Vietnam in 1972.
 Adventures of the Cocopa Personal photographs taken by the ship's electronic technician, 1973 to 1978.

 

Abnaki-class tugs
Ships built in Charleston, South Carolina
1944 ships
World War II naval ships of the United States
Ships transferred from the United States Navy to the Mexican Navy